Potato filling is a Pennsylvania Dutch recipe combining mashed potatoes and bread, and either used as a stuffing or cooked separately as a casserole, sometimes in a pig stomach. Other ingredients used in its preparation may include butter, onion, parsley, eggs, milk, salt and pepper.

History
Potato filling has been served for centuries in areas of Pennsylvania, such as in Berks County.

See also
 List of bread dishes
 List of potato dishes

References

Potato dishes
Bread dishes